The Bellevue Teatret (English: Bellevue Theatre) is a theatre in Klampenborg at the northern outskirts of Copenhagen, Denmark. Opened in 1936 to the design of Arne Jacobsen, the building is considered one of his most important architectural works and exemplar of Danish functionalism. The theatre is part of a scheme also including the adjoining Bellevue Beach and residential block and was, at the time, seen as a manifestation of "the dream of the modern lifestyle".

History
In the early 1930s, Arne Jacobsen won a competition for a masterplan for the Bellevue area im Klampenborg, Gentofte Municipality, shortly after opening his own architectural office in 1930. The Bellevue Teatret was the last stage of this scheme, which also included facilities for the local Bellevue Sea Bath and the Bellavista residential buildings. The theatre opened in 1936 as a mondain summer theatre. It closed a few seasons later, then operating as a cinema until 1980, when it was reopened as a theatre and film centre by Jes Kølpin.

Building
The building is considered one of the most important architectural work by Arne Jacobsen, exemplar of early Danish functionalism. The inside has mosaic decorations and is noted for the retractable roof. Walls, balcony and proscenium are clad in canvas and bamboo. The front curtain shows a beach girl, painted by Åge Sikker Hansen.

Repertoire
Since the reopening as a theatre, the repertoire has been dominated by modern music performances, particularly rock musicals.

An annual tradition is a Summer Ballet. Until the 2008 season produced in cooperation with Copenhagen International Ballet, it is now made in produced in cooperation with Tim Rushton and Danish Dance Theatre.

Bibliography
 Strømberg, Ulla: Bellevue Teatret. Arkitektur og teater i Arne Jacobsens bygningsværk. Forlaget Bogvaerket.dk

References

Arne Jacobsen buildings
Theatres in Copenhagen
Listed buildings and structures in Gentofte Municipality
Listed theatres in Denmark
Buildings and structures completed in 1936
Functionalist architecture
Modernist architecture in Copenhagen